Beyond These Shores is a progressive rock album by Iona, released in 1993.
Beyond These Shores is largely based on the story of St. Brendan's voyage. Brendan and a company of monks sailed from Ireland in a leather and wood boat in the sixth century to 'the promised land' which many  believe to be America.

This time the majority of the recording was at:
The Cutting Rooms, Manchester - (Engineer Nigel Palmer)
with only additional work done at
Moles Studio, Bath
St. Anne's Church, Manchester - (recording of the Piano)

The recording was remastered for the 2002 release The River Flows: Anthology and later re-released on Open Sky Records as a standalone album.

Credits

Band
 Joanne Hogg - Vocals, Acoustic Guitar, Keyboards
 Dave Bainbridge - Guitars, Piano, Keyboards
 Nick Beggs - Chapman stick, Bass guitars, Ashbury Bass
 Terl Bryant - Drums, Percussion
 Mike Haughton - Saxophone, Flute, Whistle, Recorder, Vocals

Additional Musicians and Special Guests

Robert Fripp - Guitars, Frippertronics
Frank Van Essen - Violin (on Machrie Moor)
Peter Whitfield - Violins, Viola
Troy Donockley - Uilleann pipes, Low Whistles, E-Bow Guitar
Fiona Davidson - Celtic Harp
Debbie Bainbridge (Dave's wife) - Oboe
String Ensemble
Francis Cummings - Violin
Mansell Morgan - Violin
Richard Williamson - Viola
Anna Frazer - Cello
Christopher Hoyle - Cello
Rebecca Whettan - Cello

Track listing
All track composed by Iona except where noted

Disc - Total Time – 68:26
"Prayer on the Mountain" – 2:53
"Treasure" – 4:26
"Brendan's Voyage (Navigatio)" – 4:13
"Edge of the World" – 4:47
"Today" – 3:14
"View of the Islands" – 2:30
"Bird of Heaven" – 9:11
"Murlough Bay" – 4:11
"Burning Like Fire" – 4:57
"Adrift" – 3:48
"Beachy Head" – 5:46
"Machrie Moor" (Fiona Davidson) – 4:34 
"Healing" (Davidson) – 4:47
"Brendan's Return" – 4:16
"Beyond These Shores" – 4:53

Release details
1993, UK, What Records WHAR 1300, Release Date ? ? 1993, LP
1993, UK, What Records WHAD 1300, Release Date ? ? 1993, CD
1993, UK, What Records WHAC 1300, Release Date ? ? 1993, Cassette
1993, USA, Forefront Records FFD-3014, Release Date ? ? 1993, CD
2003, UK, Open Sky Records OPENVP3CD, Release Date 3 November 2003, CD

Iona (band) albums
1993 albums